Daikundi also spelled as Dai Kundi, is one of the major tribes of Hazara people in Afghanistan mostly in Hazaristan (Hazarajat) region. They live in Daikundi Province and the Lal Wa Sarjangal, Chaghcharan, Dawlatabad, Charsadda and Pasaband districts of Ghor Province. Daikundis remained secluded and unhinged from the devastation and the resulting uprooting of different Hazara tribes, after the Battle of Uruzgan.

The Daikundi have traditionally been very closely allied with the Daizangi. Subsets of the Daikundi include the Ainak, Alak, Babuli, Baibagh, Barat, Bubak, Chahkuk, Chahush, Chora, Dawlat Beg, Doda, Fihristan, Haider Beg, Jami, Jasha, Kalanzai, Kaum-i-Ali, Khudi, Khushak, Mamaka, Mir Hazar, Neka, Roshan Beg, and Saru.

Daikundi Province was created from the upper half of the Uruzgan province of Afghanistan in 2004. It partially fulfilled the Hazara demand that their land is restored to them. The Hazaras were uprooted from Uruzgan after the 1893 Battle of Uruzgan, and the Pashtun tribes were settled on their land.

See also 
 List of Hazara tribes

References 

Hazara people
Hazara tribes
Ethnic groups in Daykundi Province
Ethnic groups in Ghor Province